The San José de la Laguna Mission and Convento, in Laguna, New Mexico, dates from 1699.  It was listed on the National Register of Historic Places in 1973, with note that it "is one of the best preserved buildings of its type in the United States. It retains most of the structures and artifacts which were placed in the Mission almost 300 years ago."

It is an adobe building which was built under direction of Fray Antonio Miranda in 1699 and following years.

It is located on Plaza Road, at the south end of St. Josephs Boulevard, in Laguna.

References

External links

Spanish missions in New Mexico
Convents in the United States
National Register of Historic Places in Valencia County, New Mexico
Buildings and structures completed in 1699